Mill Mountain Theatre (MMT) is a professional equity theatre located in Roanoke, Virginia. Originally opening as Mill Mountain Playhouse as a “not-for-profit, non-Equity resident stock theatre”, the location burned down in 1976, leading to a re-opening and renaming at the Center in the Square in 1983. The theater is named after the nearby Mill Mountain, which is a popular theme for the naming of Roanoke landmarks and organizations, including the Mill Mountain Star, Mill Mountain Zoo, and Mill Mountain Coffee and Tea.

Mill Mountain Theatre also has a longstanding relationship with Hollins University and the Hollins Theatre Institute.

History
In January 2009, Mill Mountain Theater's Board of Directors faced mounted debt by ceasing productions to focus on reorganizing the Theater's business operations. All staff members, with the exception of the director of education were laid off. At the same time MMT's landlord, Center in the Square, undertook a complete renovation, moving MMT into a temporary space.

During the reinvention process, educational classes continued and enrollment doubled, becoming one of the theatre's best sources of income during this time period. Mill Mountain Theatre Conservatory (MMTC) also produced a holiday show each year during the reorganization; Annie, Jr. in 2009, Disney's My Son Pinocchio, Geppetto's Musical Tale in December 2010, and The Best Christmas Pageant Ever in 2011 and 2012.

In March 2012, MMT produced Greater Tuna on the Waldron Stage, its first professional Equity performance since 2009. On April 24, 2013, Mill Mountain Theatre returned to the Trinkle Main Stage in the newly renovated Center in the Square presenting The Marvelous Wonderettes.

On March 16, 2020, In response to COVID-19, MMT announced that they would be "suspending all programming from March 16 - April 13", preventing their production of "Dreamgirls" from opening on March 25. Further suspensions of productions followed through the end of 2020.

Whitewashing controversy 

In March 2022, Mill Mountain Theatre was criticized for casting a white actress in the role of Vanessa in their upcoming production of In The Heights. In response to the outcry, the actress stepped down from the role, then the production was canceled altogether. The decision was reversed a day later.

Productions 
Mill Mountain Theatre classifies its performances into four types: Trinkle Mainstage, traditional plays and musicals; Young Audiences, shows aimed towards children; The Fringe, plays with contemporary themes and for older audiences; and Mill Mountain Music, showcases where various singers perform songs from a particular genre of music.
During their 2020 season announcement, Mill Mountain Theatre renamed its Waldron Fringe series to The Fringe, to signify that one of its performances would be put on the Trinkle Stage for the first time, rather than both shows being performed on the Waldron stage.

*All shows in the 2020 season were cancelled due to the COVID-19 pandemic, excluding Polkadots: The Cool Kids Musical, which was instead filmed and released online. Many shows were rescheduled to be a part of the 2021 and 2022 seasons.

**These Shakespeare plays were adapted from their source material to have a shorter runtime; no other alterations were made.

References

External links
 Mill Mountain Theatre
 Listing of past productions

Roanoke, Virginia
Theatres in Virginia
Tourist attractions in Roanoke, Virginia
1964 establishments in Virginia
Virginia culture